Sir Roger Spencer Jones OBE FLSW (born 2 July 1943) is a British researcher and manager in the pharmaceutical industry. He has chaired or been a board member of many public bodies.

Early life and education
Roger Spencer Jones was born on 2 July 1943 and brought up in a small, predominantly Welsh speaking village in the Dee valley. He was educated at Bala Boys' Grammar School and the Welsh School of Pharmacy, Cardiff. After his B.Pharm he completed his professional qualifications and went to Bradford Management School, where he gained his MSc.

Employment
He joined the Wellcome Foundation and worked in Consumer Products Marketing before taking up a line management job in Wellcome Nigeria. He then continued in line management in a regional capacity in West Africa and the Middle East. He then became responsible for Eastern Europe and the Communist Bloc where he became versed in technology transfer. He was then appointed Marketing Planning Manager and was a member of the corporate R&D committees. He left Wellcome in 1982 to establish his own Contract Development company, Penn Pharmaceuticals Ltd, which became one of the leading international companies in this field. This he sold to the management team in 1999.

He realised the importance of staff training at  the leading edge of technology and became active in the [[Training and Enterprise 
Council]]s and was Chairman of Gwent TEC and later TEC Southeast Wales. He was also appointed to be one of the Governors
of the BBC in 1996. He was appointed Chairman of the Welsh Development Agency (2002-6).

Achievements
With but little access to capital funding, he recognised the need for Contract Development in the pharmaceutical industry
and was instrumental in bringing seventeen molecules into clinical use on behalf of clients. His unpublished work on thalidomide and his understanding of the effects of polymorphic variation on bioavailability assisted Cellgene's development of the molecule. He was  the developer of high specification activated charcoal for the treatment of acute poisoning by establishing an intestinal dialysis using the gut wall as a semipermeable membrane.

He was made a Fellow of the Royal Pharmaceutical Society in 2009, and he became a "Qualified Person" under EEC regulations in 1991. He has established several successful life science companies including ZooBiotic Ltd and Phytovation Ltd.

He received an OBE in 1996, and was knighted in 2005 "for services to business and training in Wales". He received an honorary DSc from the University of Wales Cardiff in 2000. Sir Roger is a Founding Fellow of the Learned Society of Wales and in July 2010 he was appointed as its inaugural Treasurer.

Voluntary and other work
 Pro Chancellor and Chair of Swansea University (2005 -  )
 Trustee of the National Botanic Garden of Wales
 Chairman of Carmarthenshire Heritage Trust
 Trustee of Carmarthenshire Rivers Trust
 President of YMCA in Wales
 Governor of Christ College, Brecon

Interests
Nature conservation; the countryside; shooting and salmon fishing.
Club:    The Athenaeum

References

External links
 Roger Jones: Executive Profile and Biography, Bloomberg

Living people
1943 births
Fellows of the Learned Society of Wales
National Trust people